Topical decongestants are decongestants applied directly to the nasal cavity. Their effectiveness by themselves in the common cold appears to have a small benefit in adults.

Topical decongestants should only be used by patients for a maximum of 5–7 days in a row, because rebound congestion may occur in the form of rhinitis medicamentosa. When used in adults for a short period of time side effects appear to be few.

Mechanism of action
Topical decongestants are vasoconstrictors, and work by constricting the blood vessels within the nasal cavity.

Examples
 Ephedrine
 Levomethamphetamine
 Naphazoline
 Oxymetazoline
 Phenylephrine
 Pseudoephedrine
 Tramazoline
 Xylometazoline

See also
 Decongestant
 Nasal irrigation
 Nasal spray

References